Saturnia albofasciata, the white-streaked saturnia moth, is a species of silkmoth in the family Saturniidae.

The MONA or Hodges number for Saturnia albofasciata is 7753.

References

Further reading

 
 
 

albofasciata
Articles created by Qbugbot
Moths described in 1938